One Is a Lonely Number (also known as Two Is a Happy Number) is a 1972 American drama film directed by Mel Stuart, and starring Trish Van Devere, Janet Leigh, and Melvyn Douglas. The screenplay, based upon the short story "The Good Humor Man" by Rebecca Morris, was written by David Seltzer.

Plot
The story follows Aimee Brower (Van Devere), who wakes and finds her husband has left her. After learning everything about why he did it, she then proceeds to put her life back together.

Cast
Trish Van Devere as Amy Brower
Monte Markham as Howard Carpenter
Janet Leigh as Gert Meredith
Melvyn Douglas as Joseph Provo
Jane Elliot as Madge Frazier
Jonathan Lippe as Sherman Cooke
Mark Bramhall as Morgue Attendant
Paul Jenkins as James Brower
A. Scott Beach as Frawley King
Henry Leff as Arnold Holzgang
Dudley Knight as King Lear
Maurice Argent as Pool Manager
Thomas McNallan as Hardware Clerk
Joseph Spano as Earl of Kent
Morgan Upton as Earl of Gloucester
Kim Allen as Ronnie Porter
Peter Fitzsimmons as Employment Office Clerk
Christopher Brooks as Marvin Friedlander
Kathleen Quinlan (uncredited)

Awards and nominations
Golden Globe Awards
1973: Nominated, "Best Motion Picture Actress in a Dramatic Film" - Trish Van Devere

See also
 List of American films of 1972

References

External links
 
 

1972 films
1972 drama films
American drama films
1970s English-language films
1970s feminist films
Films scored by Michel Legrand
Films directed by Mel Stuart
Films set in San Francisco
Metro-Goldwyn-Mayer films
The Wolper Organization films
1970s American films